Urey may refer to:

People
Benoni Urey (born 1957), Americo-Liberian businessman and politician
Daniel Salamanca Urey (1869–1935), president of Bolivia
Harold Urey (1893-1981), American physical chemist
Urey Fedorovich Lisianski (1773–1837), explorer and officer in the Imperial Russian Navy
Urey Woodson (1859–1939), American politician, and newspaper editor and publisher

Other uses
 4716 Urey, a minor planet
 Urey (crater), a lunar impact crater
 Urey instrument (or Urey: Mars Organic and Oxidant Detector), a developmental spacecraft instrument for detecting organic compounds
 Urey Medal, given annually by the European Association of Geochemistry

See also
 Uri (disambiguation)
 Urie (disambiguation)
 Ury (disambiguation)